Pedro Silveira (born 11 December 1973) is a Mexican windsurfer. He competed in the men's Mistral One Design event at the 1996 Summer Olympics.

References

External links
 

1973 births
Living people
Mexican male sailors (sport)
Mexican windsurfers
Olympic sailors of Mexico
Sailors at the 1996 Summer Olympics – Mistral One Design
Place of birth missing (living people)